Ian Antony Kilford (born 6 October 1973 in Bristol) is an English former professional footballer who played 262 games as a midfielder in the Football League for Nottingham Forest, Wigan Athletic and Scunthorpe United. He then had a few months with Barrow in the Conference North before moving to Kendal Town of the Northern Premier League, where he was player/assistant manager, before moving onto Northwich Victoria with Lee Ashcroft in January 2013. In December 2013, Kilford joined North West Counties Division One side Nelson on a free transfer. He made a total of three league appearances for the Admirals scoring no goals.

References

External links
 
 League stats at Neil Brown's site
 Barrow stats at SoccerFactsUK

1973 births
Living people
Footballers from Bristol
English footballers
Association football midfielders
Nottingham Forest F.C. players
Wigan Athletic F.C. players
Scunthorpe United F.C. players
Barrow A.F.C. players
Kendal Town F.C. players
Northwich Victoria F.C. players
Nelson F.C. players
Northern Premier League players